The Corner Man is a 1921 British silent drama film directed by Einar Bruun and starring Ida Lambert, Eric Barclay and Sydney Folker.

Cast
 Ida Lambert as Mary Warner  
 Eric Barclay as Hugh Morland  
 Sydney Folker as Jim 
 A. Harding Steerman
 Hugh E. Wright as Bob Warner

References

Bibliography
 Palmer Scott. British Film Actors' Credits, 1895-1987. McFarland, 1988.

External links

1921 films
1921 drama films
British silent feature films
British drama films
British black-and-white films
1920s English-language films
1920s British films
Silent drama films